The stilt sandpiper (Calidris himantopus) is a small shorebird. The scientific name is from Ancient Greek. The genus name kalidris or skalidris is a term used by Aristotle for some grey-coloured waterside birds. The specific himantopus means "strap foot" or "thong foot".

Taxonomy
This sandpiper bears some resemblance to the smaller calidrid sandpipers or "stints". DNA sequence information is incapable of determining whether it should be placed in Calidris or in the monotypic genus Micropalama. It appears most closely allied with the curlew sandpiper, which is another aberrant species only tentatively placed in Calidris and could conceivably be separated with it in Erolia.

Range & habitat
The stilt sandpiper breeds in the open arctic tundra of North America. It is a long-distance migrant, wintering mainly in northern South America. It occurs as a rare vagrant in western Europe, Japan and northern Australia.

Breeding
This species nests on the ground, laying three or four eggs. The male has a display flight. Outside the breeding season, this bird is normally found on inland waters, rather than open coasts.

Description
This species resembles the curlew sandpiper in its curved bill, long neck, pale supercilium and white rump. It is readily distinguished from that species by its much longer and paler legs, which give rise to its common and scientific names. It also lacks an obvious wing bar in flight. Breeding adults are distinctive, heavily barred beneath, and with reddish patches above and below the supercilium. The back is brown with darker feather centres. Winter plumage is basically gray above and white below.
Juvenile stilt sandpipers resemble the adults in their strong head pattern and brownish back, but they are not barred below, and show white fringes on the back feathering.

Measurements:

 Length: 7.9-9.1 in (20–23 cm)
 Weight: 1.8-2.5 oz (50-70 g)
 Wingspan: 38–41 cm

Diet
These birds forage on muddy, picking up food by sight, often jabbing like the dowitchers with which they often associate. They mainly eat insects, other invertebrates (such as molluscs), seeds, and the leaves and roots of aquatic plants.

References

External links

 Stilt sandpiper species account – Cornell Lab of Ornithology
 Stilt sandpiper - Calidris himantopus – USGS Patuxent Bird Identification InfoCenter
 Stilt sandpiper photos at Oiseaux.net
 
 
 

stilt sandpiper
stilt sandpiper
Native birds of Alaska
Birds of Canada
Birds of Hispaniola
Birds of the Dominican Republic
stilt sandpiper
stilt sandpiper